Kolker is either a German-language occupational surname for a lime burner (cf. Kalker, Kalkbrenner) or a Jewish habitational name for someone from Kolki in Ukraine. Notable people with the surname include: 

Alexander Kolker (1933), Soviet and Russian composer
Ava Kolker (2006), American child actress
Boris Kolker (1939), Russian esperantist
Chris Kolker, American politician from Colorado
Henry Kolker (1874–1947), American actor and director
Jimmy J. Kolker (1948), American diplomat
Robert Kolker, American journalist
Robert P. Kolker, American film historian, theorist, and critic
Sabrina Kolker (1980), Canadian rower
Yuri Kolker (1946), Russian poet

See also
Kolker (Saga of Seven Suns), fictional character created by Kevin J Anderson

References 

German-language surnames
Jewish surnames
Ukrainian toponymic surnames